{{DISPLAYTITLE:C12H18N2O3}}
The molecular formula C12H18N2O3 (molar mass: 238.28 g/mol) may refer to:

 Nealbarbital
 Secobarbital
 Spirobarbital